Dubensky (masculine), Dubenskaya (feminine), or Dubenskoye (neuter) is the name of several rural localities in Russia:
Dubensky (rural locality), a settlement in Dubensky Settlement Council of Belyayevsky District of Orenburg Oblast
Dubenskoye, Krasnoyarsk Krai, a selo in Sineborsky Selsoviet of Shushensky District of Krasnoyarsk Krai
Dubenskoye, Nizhny Novgorod Oblast, a selo in Dubensky Selsoviet of Vadsky District of Nizhny Novgorod Oblast
Dubenskoye, Penza Oblast, a village in Yermolovsky Selsoviet of Penzensky District of Penza Oblast